Dusenberry is a surname. Notable people with the surname include:

Ann Dusenberry (born 1958), American actress
Ida Smoot Dusenberry (1873–1955)
James Verne Dusenberry (1906–1966), American anthropologist
Phil Dusenberry (1936–2007), American advertising executive
Stephen Dusenberry, American drummer
Warren Newton Dusenberry (1836–1915), American Mormon missionary